A broad-spectrum therapeutic or broad-spectrum antibiotics is a type of antimicrobial active against multiple types of pathogens, such as an antibiotic that is effective against both bacteria and viruses.  The opposite of a broad-spectrum drug is a narrow-spectrum therapeutic, which only treats a specific or very similar set of pathogens.

Such therapeutics have been suggested as potential emergency treatments for pandemics.

See also
 Broad-spectrum antibiotic

 Broad-spectrum antiviral drug

References 

Drugs